Coleophora squalorella is a moth of the family Coleophoridae. It is found from Fennoscandia to Austria, Croatia, Romania and Ukraine and from the Netherlands to the Baltic states. It is also known from the lower Volga and Ural regions of Russia and China. It occurs in steppe and semi-desert biotopes.

Adults are on wing in August.

The larvae feed on Chenopodium album, Chenopodium rubrum, Chenopodium murale and possibly Atriplex species. They feed on the generative organs of their host plant.

References

squalorella
Moths of Europe
Moths of Asia
Moths described in 1849